John Coutts may refer to:

 John Coutts (merchant) (1699–1750), Scottish merchant and banker
 John Coutts (pilot), former world number one gliding champion
 John Coutts (shipbuilder) (1810–?), Scottish shipbuilding pioneer
 John Coutts aka John Willie (1902–1962) artist, fetish photographer, editor and the publisher
 John Coutts (swimmer) (born 1956/57), former competitive swimmer from New Zealand